Hilbert C*-modules are mathematical objects that generalise the notion of a Hilbert space (which itself is a generalisation of Euclidean space), in that they endow a linear space with an "inner product" that takes values in a C*-algebra.  Hilbert C*-modules were first introduced in the work of Irving Kaplansky in 1953, which developed the theory for commutative, unital algebras (though Kaplansky observed that the assumption of a unit element was not "vital"). In the 1970s the theory was extended to non-commutative C*-algebras independently by William Lindall Paschke and Marc Rieffel, the latter in a paper that used Hilbert C*-modules to construct a theory of induced representations of C*-algebras. Hilbert C*-modules are crucial to Kasparov's formulation of KK-theory, and provide the right framework to extend the notion of Morita equivalence to C*-algebras. They can be viewed as the generalization of vector bundles to noncommutative C*-algebras and as such play an important role in noncommutative geometry, notably in C*-algebraic quantum group theory, and groupoid C*-algebras.

Definitions

Inner-product A-modules 
Let A be a C*-algebra (not assumed to be commutative or unital), its involution denoted by *. An inner-product A-module (or pre-Hilbert A-module) is a complex linear space E equipped with a compatible right A-module structure, together with a map

that satisfies the following properties:

For all x, y, z in E, and α, β in C:

(i.e. the inner product is linear in its second argument).

For all x, y in E, and a in A:

For all x, y in E:

from which it follows that the inner product is conjugate linear in its first argument (i.e. it is a sesquilinear form).

For all x in E:

and

(An element of a C*-algebra A is said to be positive if it is self-adjoint with non-negative spectrum.)

Hilbert A-modules 
An analogue to the Cauchy–Schwarz inequality holds for an inner-product A-module E:

for x, y in E.

On the pre-Hilbert module E, define a norm by

The norm-completion of E, still denoted by E, is said to be a Hilbert A-module or a Hilbert C*-module over the C*-algebra A.
The Cauchy–Schwarz inequality implies the inner product is jointly continuous in norm and can therefore be extended to the completion.

The action of A on E is continuous: for all x in E

Similarly, if {eλ} is an approximate unit for A (a net of self-adjoint elements of A for which aeλ and eλa tend to a for each a in A), then for x in E

whence it follows that EA is dense in E, and x1 = x when A is unital.
 
Let

then the closure of <E,E> is a two-sided ideal in A. Two-sided ideals are C*-subalgebras and therefore possess approximate units. One can verify that E<E,E> is dense in E. In the case when <E,E> is dense in A, E is said to be full. This does not generally hold.

Examples

Hilbert spaces 
A complex Hilbert space H is a Hilbert C-module under its inner product, the complex numbers being a C*-algebra with an involution given by complex conjugation.

Vector bundles
If X is a locally compact Hausdorff space and E a vector bundle over X with a Riemannian metric g, then the space of continuous sections of E is a Hilbert C(X)-module. The inner product is given by

The converse holds as well: Every countably generated Hilbert C*-module over a commutative C*-algebra A = C(X)  is isomorphic to the space of sections vanishing at infinity of a continuous field of Hilbert spaces over X.

C*-algebras 
Any C*-algebra A is a Hilbert A-module under the inner product <a,b> = a*b.  By the C*-identity, the Hilbert module norm coincides with C*-norm on A.

The (algebraic) direct sum of n copies of A

can be made into a Hilbert A-module by defining

One may also consider the following subspace of elements in the countable direct product of A

Endowed with the obvious inner product (analogous to that of An), the resulting Hilbert A-module is called the standard Hilbert module.

See also 
 Operator algebra

Notes

References

External links 
 
 Hilbert C*-Modules Home Page, a literature list

C*-algebras
Operator theory
Theoretical physics